The Wright Model H and Wright Model HS were enclosed fuselage aircraft built by the Wright Company

Design and development
A direct development of the Model F, the Model H introduced side by side seating for the two pilots, with long-span wings similar to the Model F. A short-span version was also produced as the Model HS, marketed as a "Military Flyer" with the improvement of an enclosed fuselage and dual controls. Its wings were shorter than the Model H for increased speed.

The Model H was a two place, side-by-side configuration seating, open cockpit, biplane with twin rudders, powered with a single engine, propelled by two chain driven pusher propellers. The engine was fully enclosed in the nose of the aircraft with a driveshaft running rearward to the propeller drive chains.

Operational history
Howard Reinhart purchased a Wright Model HS for Pancho Villa, who hired him in support of his insurgent force. It was one of three aircraft in his small air force.

In 2003, a Wright propeller matching the Model HS specifications was auctioned for over US$25,000. The construction of the propeller was hand carved wood with a linen covering, metal tips and a custom finish.

Variants
Model H (1914)  span 3-bay wings similar to the Model F, also introduced side-by-side seating.
Model HS (1915) Short span  2-bay wings

Specifications (Wright Model HS)

References

External links

Air Force photos of the Wright Model HS
Image at Library of Congress

Model HS
Single-engined twin-prop pusher aircraft